Statistics of Swedish football Division 3 for the 1941–42 season.

League standings

Uppsvenska Sydöstra 1941–42

Uppsvenska Sydvästra 1941–42

Östsvenska Norra 1941–42

Östsvenska Södra 1941–42

Centralserien Norra 1941–42

Centralserien Södra 1941–42

Nordvästra Norra 1941–42

Nordvästra Södra, Dalsland 1941–42

Nordvästra Södra, Bohus 1941–42

Mellansvenska Norra 1941–42

Mellansvenska Södra 1941–42

Sydöstra Norra 1941–42

Sydöstra Södra 1941–42

Västsvenska Norra 1941–42

Västsvenska Södra 1941–42

Sydsvenska Norra 1941–42

Sydsvenska Södra 1941–42

Footnotes

References 

Swedish Football Division 3 seasons
3
Swed